Mystro Clark (born December 29, 1966, in Dayton, Ohio) is an American entertainer who was the second permanent American host of the syndicated version of the series Soul Train from 1997 until 1999. He went on to become a film and television actor and wrote for the show Cousin Skeeter. He also executive produced for the season premiere of American Soul in 2020.

He starred in TV series such as The Newz, The Show, Off Limits, and starred in Lovespring International. He made several guest appearances in television shows, and also has starred in the movies Chairman of the Board, Storm Catcher, and  Out at the Wedding (2006).

In 2020, Clark appeared as a guest on the Studio 60 on the Sunset Strip marathon episode of The George Lucas Talk Show.

Filmography

Film

Television

Video games

References

External links 

 Mystro Clark's Website

1966 births
Living people
American male film actors
Male actors from Dayton, Ohio
African-American male actors
American male television actors
21st-century African-American people
20th-century African-American people
Soul Train